SPB Exchange (formerly JSC "Saint-Petersburg Exchange")  is located in Moscow, Russia.

In 1997, Non-Profit Partnership “Saint Petersburg Stock Exchange” was created and became the first licensed stock exchange in Russia, with NP RTS as one of its partners. In the same year, Non-Profit Partnership “Saint Petersburg Stock Exchange” launched an electronic derivative trading platform and, by 2000, it became the leading derivatives exchange in Russia. In 2014, foreign equity securities trading started on SPB Exchange platform. By the end of 2017, all the equity securities in the S&P 500 Index became available for trading on SPB platform and a T+2 settlement cycle to match the cycle of U.S. exchanges was also introduced the same year. In July 2021 the exchange changed its name to Public Joint-Stock Company "SPB Exchange". SPB Exchange is the legal successor of the Stock exchange “Saint-Petersburg”.

History of the Saint-Petersburg Exchange 
The Stock exchange “Saint-Petersburg” was founded in accordance with requirements of the Federal Law “On Securities Market” on the basis of stock exchange department of CJSC “Exchange “Saint-Petersburg” in April 1997, having received Stock Exchange License No.1 in Russia from Financial Markets Federal Agency. In accordance with Russian Federation Government order No.654 the Stock exchange “Saint-Petersburg” became one of the four stock exchanges, authorized to organize trades of JSC "Gazprom" shares.

Stock Market in JSC “Saint-Petersburg Exchange” 
Open Joint-Stock Company “Saint-Petersburg Exchange” became the legal successor of Stock exchange “Saint-Petersburg” and continued to trade JSC “Gazprom” shares for all its participants. Today, JSC “Saint-Petersburg” is the only exchange which has JSC “Gazprom” shares in its listing.

Derivatives Market in JSC “Saint-Petersburg Exchange” 

In February 2011, JSC “Saint-Petersburg exchange” and JSC “RTS Stock Exchange” carried out a joint project on organization of trading of commodities futures.

Old Saint Petersburg Stock Exchange and Rostral Columns (old buildings)

External links

Financial services companies of Russia
Stock exchanges in Europe
Buildings and structures in Saint Petersburg
Stock exchanges in Russia
Companies based in Saint Petersburg